Massachusetts House of Representatives' 16th Suffolk district in the United States is one of 160 legislative districts included in the lower house of the Massachusetts General Court. It covers parts of Essex County and Suffolk County. Democrat RoseLee Vincent of Revere has represented the district since 2015. Candidates for this district seat in the 2020 Massachusetts general election include Joseph Gravellese and Jessica Giannino.

Locales represented

The district includes the following localities:
 part of Chelsea
 part of Revere
 part of Saugus

The current district geographic boundary overlaps with those of the Massachusetts Senate's 3rd Essex district, Middlesex and Suffolk district, and 1st Suffolk and Middlesex district.

Representatives
 Jeremiah Desmond, circa 1888 
 James Donovan, circa 1888 
 Addison P. Beardsley, circa 1920 
 Coleman Silbert, circa 1920 
 William Francis Keenan, circa 1951 
 Bernard M. Lally, circa 1951 
 Robert L. Fortes, circa 1975 
 William Reinstein
 Kathi-Anne Reinstein
 Roselee Vincent, 2015-
 Jessica Giannino, 2021-current

See also
 List of Massachusetts House of Representatives elections
 Other Suffolk County districts of the Massachusetts House of Representatives: 1st, 2nd, 3rd, 4th, 5th, 6th, 7th, 8th, 9th, 10th, 11th, 12th, 13th, 14th, 15th,  17th, 18th, 19th
 List of Massachusetts General Courts
 List of former districts of the Massachusetts House of Representatives

Images

References

Further reading

External links
 Ballotpedia
  (State House district information based on U.S. Census Bureau's American Community Survey).

House
Government of Suffolk County, Massachusetts
Government of Essex County, Massachusetts